Because I Love You is a 2017 South Korean fantasy-comedy omnibus film starring Cha Tae-hyun and Kim Yoo-jung. Directed by Joo Ji-hoong, it premiered on January 4, 2017. This movie starring Cha Tae-hyun is produced by his elder brother Cha Ji-hyun who also produced the film The Grand Heist starring Tae-hyun.

Synopsis
This movie is about Lee Hyeong (Cha Tae-hyun) whose spirit, after an accident, started entering the bodies of people struggling with love, and Scully (Kim Yoo-jung), the high school student who guides his spirit along the way.

Cast

Cha Tae-hyun as Jin Yi-hyung
Kim Yoo-jung as Jang Soo-yi (Scully)
Seo Hyun-jin as Lee Hyun-kyung
Sung Dong-il as Park Chan-il
Oh Na-ra as Park Chan-il's wife
Bae Sung-woo as Ahn Yeo-don
Kim Sa-hee as Da-in
Kim Yoon-hye as Kim Mal-hee
Jang Do-yoon as Yo-Seb
Lee Jae-woo as Audition PD
Hong Kyung-min as Senior Judge
Lim Ju-hwan as Chan-young
Kim Kang-hoon as Park Jung-min
Sun Woo Yong Nyeo as old woman with Alzheimer's
Park Geun-hyung as husband of old woman with Alzheimer's
Jang Hyuk as Fortune teller
Yoon Da-kyung as Kim Mal-hee's mother 
 Ok Ja-yeon as School guard

References

External links 
 
 
 

South Korean fantasy comedy films
2010s fantasy comedy films
Next Entertainment World films
2017 films
2017 comedy films
2010s South Korean films